James Munroe Stone (August 13, 1817 – December 19, 1880) was a U.S. labor reform advocate and politician who served as a member, and from 1866 to 1867, the Speaker of, the Massachusetts House of Representatives.

Newspaper publisher
In the early 1840s Stone published the Worcester based weekly newspaper the State Sentinel, later the State Sentinel and Reformer.

Labor reform advocate
Stone was a major advocate of labor reform in Massachusetts, he worked for years to pass the Ten Hour work day legislation in Massachusetts.

See also
 88th Massachusetts General Court (1867)

References

Speakers of the Massachusetts House of Representatives
Members of the Massachusetts House of Representatives
Politicians from Boston
Politicians from Worcester, Massachusetts
Politicians from Lowell, Massachusetts
19th-century American newspaper editors
19th-century American newspaper publishers (people)
American temperance activists
1817 births
1880 deaths
American railroad executives
19th-century American politicians